Araria Lok Sabha constituency is one of the 40 Lok Sabha (parliamentary) constituencies in Bihar state in eastern India. It is unreserved.

Assembly segments
Araria Lok Sabha constituency comprises the following six assembly segments:

Members of Parliament 

^ by poll

Source:

Election Results

References

See also
 Araria district
 List of Constituencies of the Lok Sabha

Lok Sabha constituencies in Bihar
Politics of Araria district